Dimokratias (literally Democracy [Square]) is an under-construction metro station serving Thessaloniki Metro's Line 1 and Line 2. It is expected to enter service in 2023. Construction of this station has been held back by major archaeological finds, and it is designated as a high-importance archaeological site by Attiko Metro, the company overseeing its construction. At this station, an ancient and early Christian cemetery & church were found, as well as Ottoman inns and warehouses. The station was initially located further west, but was moved eastward so that it falls outside of the medieval Walls of Thessaloniki, thus reducing the chance of major archaeological works.

Dimokratias station also appears in the 1988 Thessaloniki Metro proposal under the name Vardari. Vardari Square is an alternative name for Dimokratias Square.

References

See also
List of Thessaloniki Metro stations

Thessaloniki Metro